Gerenzago is a comune (municipality) in the Province of Pavia in the Italian region Lombardy, located about 35 km southeast of Milan and about 15 km east of Pavia.

Gerenzago borders the following municipalities: Copiano, Corteolona e Genzone, Inverno e Monteleone, Magherno, Villanterio. Economy is mostly based on agriculture and craftmanship, in particular related to building activities.

References

Cities and towns in Lombardy